The IFBB Hall of Fame was established in 1999 to honor outstanding athletes and officials in the sport of bodybuilding. There have been no inductees since 2011.

Induction years

1999
Carla Dunlap
Cory Everson
John Grimek
Lee Haney
Rachel McLish
Sergio Oliva
Reg Park
Bill Pearl
Steve Reeves
Arnold Schwarzenegger
Larry Scott
Frank Zane

2000
Chris Dickerson
Dave Draper
George Eiferman
Bev Francis
Lisa Lyon
Clarence Ross
Abbye "Pudgy" Stockton

2001
Kay Baxter
Albert Beckles
Franco Columbu
Jack Delinger
Diana Dennis
Kike Elomaa
Eugen Sandow

2002
Samir Bannout
Laura Combes
Ronald Essmaker
Barton Horvath
Mike Mentzer
Chuck Sipes

2003
Leroy Colbert
Lynn Conkwright
Lou Ferrigno
Bert Goodrich
Tom Platz
Dorian Yates

2004
Ed Corney
Rich Gaspari
Lee Labrada
Harold Poole
Alan Stephen
Ellen Van Maris

2005
Stacey Bentley
Mike Christian
Mohamed Makkawy
Oscar State
Armand Tanny
Rick Wayne

2006
Jules Bacon
Sigmund Klein
Ron Love
Dennis Tinerino
Claudia Wilbourn

2007
Boyer Coe
Laura Creavalle
George Hackenschmidt
Mike Katz
Irvin Koszewski
Shawn Ray
Arthur Saxon

2008
Roy Callender
Kim Chizevsky-Nicholls
Berry de Mey
Don Howorth

2009
Juliette Bergmann
Kevin Levrone
Danny Padilla
Flex Wheeler

2010
 Susie Curry
 Vickie Gates
 Lenda Murray
 Ben Weider
 Joe Weider

2011
 John Balik
 Porter Cottrell
 Mike Francois
 Tonya Knight
 Anja Langer
 Jim Manion
 Carol Semple-Marzetta
 Saryn Muldrow
 Art Zeller
 Napolean Bonaparte

Honored officials
Oscar State
Warren Langman

References

External links
IFBB Hall of Fame website
IFBB Hall of Fame Years

Bodybuilding
Professional bodybuilding
Sports halls of fame
Halls of fame in Spain
Awards established in 1999
Awards disestablished in 2011